Jeffersonville is a home rule-class city in Montgomery County, Kentucky, in the United States. The population was 1,506 at the 2010 U.S. census. It is part of the Mount Sterling micropolitan area.

History
Jeffersonville began as an important cattle-trading center in Eastern Kentucky during the mid-19th century. It was then known as Ticktown, either for the tickgrass (Eragrostis echinochloidea) in the area or for the ticks in the cattle pens. Although it is unknown when the settlement became known as Jeffersonville, the first post office was established under that name on March 9, 1866. It presumably honors Pres. Thomas Jefferson.

Jeffersonville was incorporated on March 20, 1876.

Geography

Jeffersonville is located at  (37.969148, -83.824466).

Demographics

As of the census of 2000, there were 1,804 people, 682 households, and 525 families residing in the city. The racial makeup of the city was 99.06% White, 0.11% African American, 0.11% Native American, 0.17% Asian, and 0.55% from two or more races. Hispanic or Latino of any race were 0.94% of the population.

There were 682 households, out of which 38.4% had children under the age of 18 living with them, 61.6% were married couples living together, 12.3% had a female householder with no husband present, and 22.9% were non-families. 19.6% of all households were made up of individuals, and 8.8% had someone living alone who was 65 years of age or older. The average household size was 2.65 and the average family size was 3.02.

In the city, the population was spread out, with 26.6% under the age of 18, 8.6% from 18 to 24, 31.4% from 25 to 44, 22.4% from 45 to 64, and 11.0% who were 65 years of age or older. The median age was 34 years. For every 100 females, there were 101.3 males. For every 100 females age 18 and over, there were 96.1 males.

The median income for a household in the city was $29,392, and the median income for a family was $33,355. Males had a median income of $26,492 versus $17,576 for females. The per capita income for the city was $13,254. About 14.7% of families and 18.5% of the population were below the poverty line, including 22.7% of those under age 18 and 19.7% of those age 65 or over.

Education

Public schools

Most students residing within Jeffersonville attend the following schools, which are located in nearby Mount Sterling:
Early Learning Center
Camargo Elementary School
Mapleton Elementary School
Mount Sterling Elementary School
J.B. McNabb Middle School
Montgomery County High School

Private schools
Jeffersonville Christian Academy
Grace Christian Academy

References

Cities in Kentucky
Cities in Montgomery County, Kentucky
Mount Sterling, Kentucky micropolitan area
Populated places established in 1876
1876 establishments in Kentucky